There is a significant community of Brazilians in Japan, consisting largely but not exclusively of Brazilians of Japanese descent. Brazilians with Japanese descent are known as Nikkei Brazilians. They constitute the largest number of native Portuguese speakers in Asia, greater than those of formerly Portuguese East Timor, Macao and Goa combined. Likewise, Brazil maintains its status as home to the largest Japanese community outside Japan.

Migration history
During the 1980s, the Japanese economic situation improved and achieved stability. Many Japanese Brazilians went to Japan as contract workers due to economic and political problems in Brazil and they were termed "Dekasegi". Working visas were offered to Brazilian Dekasegi in 1990, encouraging more immigration from Brazil.

In 1990, the Japanese government authorized the legal entry through visas of Japanese and their descendants until the third generation in Japan. At that time, Japan was receiving a large number of illegal immigrants from Pakistan, Bangladesh, China and Thailand. The legislation of 1990 was intended to select immigrants who entered Japan, giving a clear preference for Japanese descendants from South America, especially Brazil. These people were lured to Japan to work in areas that the Japanese refused (the so-called "three K": Kitsui, Kitanai and Kiken – dirty, dangerous and demeaning). Many Japanese Brazilians began to immigrate. The influx of Japanese descendants from Brazil to Japan was and continues to be large. By 1998, there were 222,217 Brazilians in Japan, making up 81% of all Latin Americans there (with most of the remainder being Japanese Peruvians and Japanese Argentines).

Because of their Japanese ancestry, the Japanese Government believed that Brazilians would be more easily integrated into Japanese society. In fact, this easy integration did not happen, since Japanese Brazilians and their children born in Japan are treated as foreigners by native Japanese. Even people who were born in Japan and immigrated at an early age to Brazil and then returned to Japan are treated as foreigners. Despite the fact that most Brazilians in Japan look Japanese and have a recent Japanese background, they do not "act Japanese" and have a Brazilian identity, and in many if not most cases speak Portuguese as their first or only language. This apparent contradiction between being and seeming causes conflicts of adaptation for the migrants and their acceptance by the natives. (There have been comparable problems in Germany with Russians of ethnic German descent, showing that this phenomenon is not necessarily unique to Japan.)

In April 2009, due to the financial crisis, the Japanese government introduced a new program that would incentivize Brazilian and other Latin American immigrants to return home with a stipend of $3000 for airfare and $2000 for each dependent. Those who participate must agree not to pursue employment in Japan in the future.

As of June 2022, there were 207,081 Brazilian nationals in Japan, of whom 113,521 were permanent residents.

Integration and Community

Brazilians of Japanese descent in particular find themselves the targets of discrimination; some local Japanese scorn them as the descendants of "social dropouts" who emigrated from Japan because they were "giving up" on Japanese society, whereas others perceive them more as objects of pity than scorn, people who were forced into emigrating by unfortunate circumstances beyond their control such as birth order or lack of opportunities in rural areas. The largest numbers are concentrated in Toyota, Ōizumi, where it is estimated that up to 15% of the population speaks Portuguese as their native language, and Hamamatsu, which contains the largest population of Brazilians in Japan. Brazilians are not particularly concentrated in larger cities such as Tokyo or Osaka. Brazilians tend to be more concentrated where there are large factories, as most who first moved to Japan tended to work in automobile plants and the like.

As of 2004, the cities with under 1,000,000 total inhabitants with the largest Brazilian Nikkei populations were Hamamatsu (12,766), Toyohashi (10,293), Toyota (6,266), Okazaki (4,500), Suzuka (4,084), Kani (3,874), Komaki (3,629), Isesaki (3,372), Ōta (3,245), and Ōgaki (3,129). The cities with 1,000,000 or more inhabitants had low percentages of Brazilians.

In the late 2000s, it was estimated that each year, 4,000 Brazilian immigrants returned to Brazil from Japan.

Brazilian identity in Japan

Many Brazilians of Japanese descent face discrimination in both Brazil and Japan. In Brazil they are often discriminated against because of their Japanese appearance and heritage and in Japan they are looked down on because their customs, cultural behavior, and Japanese language proficiency are not up to Japan's native standard. In Japan, many Japanese Brazilians suffer prejudice because they do not know how to speak Japanese correctly. Despite their Japanese appearance and heritage, many Japanese Brazilians in Japan are culturally very Brazilian, often only speaking Brazilian Portuguese, and are treated as foreigners.

Academic studies report that many Japanese Brazilians felt (and were often treated) as Japanese in Brazil. But when they move to Japan, they realize that they strongly feel their Brazilian background. In Brazil, Japanese Brazilians rarely listened to samba or participated in a carnival parade. However, once in Japan, Japanese Brazilians often promote carnivals and samba festivities in the Japanese cities to demonstrate their pride of being Brazilian.

The Brazilian influence in Japan is growing. Tokyo has the largest carnival parade outside of Brazil itself. Portuguese is the third most spoken foreign language in Japan, after Chinese and Korean, and is among the most studied languages by students in the country. In Ōizumi, Gunma, it is estimated that 15% of the population speak Portuguese as their native language. Japan has two newspapers in the Portuguese language, besides radio and television stations spoken in that language. The Brazilian fashion and Bossa Nova music are also popular among Japanese.

Socioeconomics 
Japanese Brazilians have benefited tremendously from migrating to Brazil. An anthropologist known as Takeyuki Tsuda, coined the term "positive minority" to describe Japanese Brazilians' socioeconomic status in Brazil. The majority of Brazilians with Japanese descent have a high socioeconomic status despite their inactivity in politics and smaller demographics. They were viewed in Brazil as a “model minority,” meaning that were looked up upon by other Brazilian natives with their good education and middle class economic status. When Japanese Brazilians migrated back to Japan, many of them faced a drastic change to their social and ethnic status. Many Japanese Brazilian immigrants took over jobs that were viewed as low skilled, high labor, and dirty to Japanese society due to an inability to speak fluently in Japanese. Despite the negative stigma, many of these blue-collar jobs in Japan provided higher pay than white collar jobs in Brazil. This motivated many Japanese Brazilians to migrate back to Japan.

Religion
With Catholicism widespread in Brazil, in the early days of Brazilian migration to Japan, Catholic churches often served as spaces for migrant gatherings and socialization. After World War II many first generation Japanese migrants encouraged their offspring to convert to the Catholic religion for social and economic opportunities in Brazil. However, the growth of secular Brazilian community organization, media, and businesses in Japan has taken over part of this role from the churches. Migrants, including Brazilians, make up perhaps as much as half of the total Catholic population in Japan. However, differences in culture and even in religious tradition have made it difficult to integrate Brazilian migrants into native Japanese Catholic congregations. For example, in the Saitama Diocese, although Japanese-speaking and Portuguese-speaking congregation share the same church building, exchange between them is almost non-existent, and the two groups hold ceremonies, celebrations, and other events separately. There is also a growing number of Pentecostal denominations in Japan led by migrants from Brazil.

Japanese new religions see the stream of Brazilian migration as an opportunity to gain new converts. The Church of World Messianity (SKK, for Sekai Kyūsei Kyō) is one Japanese new religion which has had a strong following in Brazil; by 1998 they had 300,000 members in Brazil, 97% of non-Japanese background. With the increase in Brazilian migration to Japan, by 2006 a total of 21 Johrei centres had engaged Brazilian SKK missionaries in order to provide Portuguese-language orientation to Brazilian migrants. They have been somewhat more successful than Catholics in promoting integration between the Brazilian and Japanese parts of their congregations.

Employment

Brazilians tend to take jobs considered undesirable by native Japanese, such as working in electronics factories, and in the automotive sector. Most Brazilians go to Japan attracted by the recruiting agencies in conjunction with the factories. Many Brazilians are subjected to hours of exhausting work, earning a small salary by Japanese standards. Nevertheless, in 2002, Brazilians living in Japan sent US$2.5 billion to Brazil.

Education

As of 2005 there were 40,000 Brazilian children of school age in Japan. By 2008 the number of Brazilian school age children was almost 33,500. As of 2005 8,000 study at Japanese schools, and by 2008 that number was about 10,000. The children of Dekasegi Brazilians encounter difficulties in Japanese schools. As of 2005 15,000 study at one of the 63 private Brazilian schools. The Ministry of Education of Brazil approved 36 of them.

As of 2005 17,000 school-aged Brazilian children were not attending school. As of 2008 thousands of Brazilian children are out of school in Japan. Adriana Stock of the BBC stated that the school fees were too high for many Brazilian parents.

Nonetheless, since reverse migration, many of Japanese Brazilians who are not of mixed ancestry have also endeavored to learn Japanese to native levels. However while such cases like these are high, the statistics fail to show high rate of such Japanese Brazilians succeeding to integrate into Japanese society because vast number of such people end up achieving Japanese naturalization. Once they obtain Japanese citizenship, regardless of whether or not the Japanese citizen is still considered to be a citizen of Brazil in the eyes of the Brazilian government, Japanese statistics record such people as only Japanese. If they pursue university in Japan, they must take exams alongside other native Japanese citizens. Thus even while Japan has many Japanese Brazilians that are completely bilingual, with Japanese statistics failing to count Japanese Brazilians who have since naturalized, these such Japanese Brazilians are not given the credit statistically for the fact that Japanese society has placed a much higher bar for them to integrate into Japanese society than other non Japanese foreigners, and have since successfully integrated into Japanese society both culturally and linguistically.

Notable people
 Adriana, model
 Carolina Kaneda, model
 Gilson Yamada, actor
 Kanako Minami, singer
 Kelly, model
 Viviane Ono, model
Kana Oya, model
Ryūkō Gō, rikishi
Carlos Ghosn, businessman
Kaisei Ichirō, rikishi
Yuu Kamiya, novelist
Wagner Lopes, football player
Erikson Noguchipinto, football player
Ruy Ramos, football player
Ademir Santos, football player
Alessandro Santos, football player
Marcos Sugiyama, volleyball player
Marcus Tulio Tanaka, football player
Goiti Yamauchi, mixed martial arts fighter
Gabriel Kazu

Media 
 International Press (newspaper) - Established by Yoshio Muranaga in 1991. In 1996 its weekly circulation was 55,000.
 IPC (television station)
 Tudo Bem (magazine)

See also
 Brazil–Japan relations
 Fushūgaku
 Japanese Brazilians

References

Notes

Sources
 
  - Google Books Snippet view available

Further reading
Books:
 
 
 
 
 Sugino, Toshiko (杉野 俊子). Nikkei Brazilians at a Brazilian School in Japan : Factors affecting language decisions and education. Keio University Press, August 2008.  [4766415469]. See catalog entry.
 Book review: Adachi, Nobuko. "Nikkei Brazilians at a Brazilian School in Japan: Factors Affecting Language Decisions and Education by Toshiko Sugino." World Englishes. Volume 28, Issue 3, pages 413–416, September 2009. First published online: 3 August 2009. DOI: 10.1111/j.1467-971X.2009.01600_4.x.

Dissertations:
 Sugino, Toshiko (杉野 俊子). "Nikkei Brazilians at a Brazilian school in Japan: Factors affecting language decisions and education" (PhD thesis). Temple University, 2007. Publication Number 3293262. Profile at Google Books.

Journal articles:
 Sugino, Toshiko (杉野 俊子; National Defense Academy of Japan). "Linguistic Challenges and Possibilities of Immigrants In Case of Nikkei Brazilians in Japan" (Country Note on Topics for Breakout Session 4) (Archive). Centre for Education Research and Innovation (CERI), Organisation for Economic Co-operation and Development See list of reports.
 Takenoshita, Hirohisa (Shizuoka University), Yoshimi Chitose (National Institute of Population and Social Security Research), Shigehiro Ikegami (Shizuoka University of Art and Culture) and Eunice Akemi Ishikawa (Shizuoka University of Art and Culture)."Segmented Assimilation, Transnationalism, and Educational Attainment of Brazilian Migrant Children in Japan." International Migration. Special Issue: THE GLOBALLY MOBILE SKILLED LABOUR FORCE: POLICY CHALLENGES AND ECONOMIC OPPORTUNITIES. Volume 52, Issue 2, pages 84–99, April 2014. Published online 2 May 2013. DOI: 10.1111/imig.12057.
 Yamaguchi, Yuki (山口 夕貴; Japanese School of Hanoi) and Shigeru Asanuma (浅沼 茂 Asanuma Shigeru; Tokyo Gakugei University). "A Study of the Creativity of the Children in the Background of Cultural Duality" (Archive; カルチュラル・デュアリティーを背景にもつ児童の創造性の研究). Bulletin of Tokyo Gakugei University, Educational sciences (東京学芸大学紀要. 総合教育科学系) 66(1), 27–37, 2015-02-27. Tokyo Gakugei University. See profile at CiNii. See profile at Tokyo Gakugei University.
 Discusses Japanese Brazilians and returnees from abroad

Ethnic groups in Japan
Japan
 
 
Immigration to Japan
Racism in Japan